Anna Meixner is an Austrian ice hockey forward, currently playing with Brynäs IF Dam in the Swedish Women's Hockey League (SDHL) and the Austrian national team. A four-time European Women's Hockey League (EWHL) champion, she is the second highest all-time scorer in EHV Sabres Vienna history and the fourth highest scorer all-time for Austria.

Playing career 
Meixner grew up playing on boys' teams of EK Zeller Eisbären (EKZ) in her hometown of Zell am See. When she turned 16, Austrian Ice Hockey Association regulations prevented her from playing on a boys' team any longer and, because EKZ did not have any teams for women or girls, she moved to Salzburg to play with DEC Salzburg in the Austrian Women's Ice Hockey Bundesliga (DEBL). She then moved to Vienna at age 17 to play for the women's team EHV Sabres Vienna in the European Women's Hockey League.

At the age of 22, she left Austria to sign with HV71 Dam in the SDHL. She would score 16 points in 17 games of the 2016–17 SDHL season, as the club made it to the finals of the SDHL playoffs.

Following the season with HV71, Meixner returned to the EHV Sabres

In May 2020, she announced her return to Sweden to play for Brynäs IF. She started the 2020–21 SDHL season strongly, scoring six goals in the first five games, as Brynäs became the last remaining undefeated team in the league, and winning the first Goal of the Week award for the season.

International  
Meixner took part in the 2012 Winter Youth Olympics and won a silver medal with Austria in the women's ice hockey tournament.

References

External links
 
 
 

Living people
1994 births
Austrian expatriate ice hockey people
Austrian expatriate sportspeople in Sweden
Austrian ice hockey forwards
Austrian women's ice hockey players
Brynäs IF Dam players
European Women's Hockey League players
HV71 Dam players
Ice hockey players at the 2012 Winter Youth Olympics
People from Zell am See
Sportspeople from Salzburg (state)
Women's ice hockey forwards